Il Ridotto (Italian : "The Private Room") was a wing of Venice's Palazzo Dandolo near the church of  San Moisè. In 1638, it was converted at the behest of Venice's city leaders into a government-owned  gambling-house. Il Ridotto was the site of the West's first public, legal mercantile casino, opening several centuries after some gambling establishments in China.

Etymology and usage
The term "ridotto" (plural: "ridotti") comes from the Italian word "ridurre", meaning to "close off" or "make private". Whatever its etymology, it ordinarily meant the foyer of a theater, where people would go for refreshments during intermissions. It also referred to several illegal, privately owned gambling clubs that offered games of chance to members of Venice's nobility in the city's Rialto District. These clubs came into being after the Venetian authorities attempted to ban games of chance that had spontaneously sprung up in the city's streets. Realizing it could not effectively prevent citizens from wagering on dice and card games, the Great Council of Venice opened its "Ridotto" in 1638 on the occasion of the city's annual Spring Carnival.

Casino Era

According to the casino's original charter, access to Il Ridotto was open to the public. However, due to its high stakes and formal dress code, only nobles could afford to play at the casino's tables; one such discriminating injunction, for instance, was that players had to wear three-cornered hats and masks in order to participate in Il Ridotto's games; less affluent Venetians were thereby prohibited from making wagers at the casino's tables.

As for games, Il Ridotto is known to have offered biribi and basetta. Biribi was a lottery-like game in which players placed bets on one of 70 possible outcomes. A casino employee, the "banker", would then draw a number from a bag, and anyone who had bet on that number would win the game's pot. The game featured a built-in vigorish whereby a winning player only collected 64 times his original bet; considering that every outcome in the game gave only roughly a 1 percent chance of winning for any given bet, this meant that the house at Il Ridotto enjoyed nearly a 10 percent vigorish on the game.

The most popular game at Il Ridotto, however, was the card game basetta. This game was a cross between blackjack, poker, and gin rummy and offered winning players 60 times their wagers in payout. In later years, it was replaced by card game faro, which would gain even greater popularity in the U.S.

Architecture

The wing of the San Moisè Palace in which the Ridotto originally operated was four stories tall and featured a long entrance hall, dining rooms and other fineries like work from artist Gerolamo Colonna. Its gaming tables, meanwhile, were primarily situated in its upper floors.

Closing

In 1774, Venetian reformer Giorgio Pisani proposed the city close the Ridotto "to preserve the piety, sound discipline and moderate behavior". Pisani's motion passed by an overwhelming majority and the casino closed its doors the same year.

References

Casinos in Italy
1638 establishments in the Republic of Venice
1774 disestablishments
1638 establishments in Italy